This is a comprehensive discography of Entombed, a Swedish death metal band.

Studio albums

EPs

Split albums

Live albums

Compilations

Demos

Video albums

Other appearances

Music videos

References

Heavy metal group discographies
Discographies of Swedish artists